Alfred Georg Mickler (September 7, 1892 – June 14, 1915) was a German track and field athlete who competed in the 1912 Summer Olympics. In 1912 he was eliminated in the first round of the 1500 metres competition. He was also a member of the German team which was eliminated in the first round of the 3000 metres team race by Sweden.

He was killed in action during World War I.

See also
 List of Olympians killed in World War I

References

External links
list of German athletes

1892 births
1915 deaths
German male middle-distance runners
Olympic athletes of Germany
Athletes (track and field) at the 1912 Summer Olympics
German military personnel killed in World War I